Kaina Lake is located in Glacier National Park, in the U. S. state of Montana. Kaina Lake is south of Kaina Mountain.

See also
List of lakes in Glacier County, Montana

References

Lakes of Glacier National Park (U.S.)
Lakes of Glacier County, Montana